Margalit Fox (born 1961) is an American writer. She began her career in publishing in the 1980s, before switching to journalism in the 1990s. She joined the obituary department of The New York Times in 2004, and authored over 1,400 obituaries before her retirement from the staff of the paper in 2018. Fox has written several non-fiction books.

Biography
Fox was born in Glen Cove, New York, the daughter of David (a physicist) and Laura Fox. She attended Barnard College in New York City and then Stony Brook University, where she completed her bachelor's degree (1982) and then a master's degree in linguistics in 1983. She received a master's degree from the Columbia University Graduate School of Journalism in 1991. Fox also studied the cello.

In the 1980s, before attending journalism school, Fox worked in book and magazine publishing. She joined The New York Times in 1994 as a copy editor for its Book Review. She has written widely on language, culture and ideas for The New York Times, New York Newsday, Variety and other publications. Her work was anthologized in Best Newspaper Writing, 2005. Fox moved to the obituary department of The New York Times in 2004. There she wrote over 1,400 obituaries before retiring as a senior writer in 2018, penning an article for the paper about her own retirement. She then began to pursue book writing full-time. She left the newspaper with about 80 advance obituaries that continue to give her New York Times bylines years later. Since 2013, Fox has been a member of the usage panel of the American Heritage Dictionary.

The Newswomen's Club of New York awarded Fox its Front Page Award in 2011 for her collection of work at The New York Times and again in 2015 for "beat reporting". In 2014, she won Stanford University's William Saroyan International Prize for Writing for her book The Riddle of the Labyrinth: The Quest to Crack an Ancient Code. The New York Times also ranked the book as one of the "100 Notable Books of 2013." In 2014, The Paris Review called Fox "An instrumental figure in pushing the obituary past Victorian-era formal constraints". In its 2015 roundup of "Best journalism of 2015", Sports Illustrated referred to her as "The great NYT obit writer". In 2016, Atlantic Monthly described her as "the finest obituarist at The New York Times". Calling her "The Artist of the Obituary", Andrew Ferguson wrote in Commentary magazine: "Margalit Fox is one of those writers ... whose every paragraph carries an undercurrent of humor ... you’re never more than a few sentences away from an ironic aside or wry observation or the sudden appearance of some cockeyed fact. ... Stranger still, Fox maintains her writerly bounce despite her regular subject, which is death. ...Fox is ... the best writer all around, at the New York Times. Her writing is featured in The Sense of Style (2014), the writing guide by Steven Pinker.

Fox has said: "In the course of an obit, you’re charged with taking your subject from the cradle to the grave, which gives you a natural narrative arc. ... 98 percent of the obit has nothing to do with death, but with life. ... We like to say it’s the jolliest department in the paper." Fox is featured in Vanessa Gould's 2016 documentary film Obit about the New York Times obituary staff. She considers that her journalism work was the perfect training for book writing: "All of the structural devices that a book requires – the formal techniques that give a story its shape; keep it moving along nicely; and introduce the reader, bit by comfortable bit, to new concepts – are already fully present in any good newspaper article. It becomes, then, simply a question of magnitude … and endurance."

In 2022 her book, The Confidence Men: How Two Prisoners of War Engineered the Most Remarkable Escape in History, was nominated for the Edgar Award in the category of Best Fact Crime. The New York Times Book Review said that Fox "unspools the men's delightfully elaborate prison-break scheme in nail-biting episodes that advance like a narrative Rube Goldberg machine". She is adapting the book for Thunder Road Films in her screenwriting debut.

Fox is married to writer and critic George Robinson.

Bibliography

Books
 Talking Hands: What Sign Language Reveals About the Mind, Simon & Schuster (2007) 
 The Riddle of the Labyrinth: The Quest to Crack an Ancient Code, Ecco Press (2013) 
 Conan Doyle for the Defense: The True Story of a Sensational British Murder, a Quest for Justice, and the World's Most Famous Detective Writer, Random House (2018) 
 The Confidence Men: How Two Prisoners of War Engineered the Most Remarkable Escape in History, Random House (2021)

Selected obituaries

 Virginia Hamilton Adair
 Betty Allen
 Maya Angelou
 Emmett L. Bennett, Jr.
 Christine Brooke-Rose
 Joyce Brothers
 Robert N. Buck
 Diahann Carroll
 Robert L. Chapman
 Lili Chookasian
 Hugues Cuénod
 Leo Dillon

 Patty Duke
 Betty Friedan
 John Gardner (British writer)
 Jim Gary
 Dorothy Gilman
 Crawford Hallock Greenewalt, Jr.
 Arthur Haggerty
 Seamus Heaney
 Katherine Johnson
 Fred Kilgour
 Alice Kober
 Eppie Lederer (Ann Landers)

 Kurt Masur
 Anne McCaffrey
 René A. Morel
 Toni Morrison
 Patricia Neway
 Pauline Phillips (Dear Abby)
 Ingrid Pitt
 Chaim Potok
 James Randi
 Adrienne Rich
 Anneliese Rothenberger
 Albert Schatz (scientist)

 Jane Scott
 Tony Scott (musician)
 Maurice Sendak
 Rudi Stern 
 Kirtanananda Swami
 Keith Tantlinger
 Dave Tatsuno
 Marie Tharp
 Blanche Thebom
 Dolores Wilson
 Frances Yeend

References

External links

Selection of Fox's New York Times obituaries

1961 births
20th-century American non-fiction writers
20th-century American women writers
21st-century American non-fiction writers
21st-century American women writers
Columbia University Graduate School of Journalism alumni
Living people
Obituary writers
Stony Brook University alumni
The New York Times writers
Writers from Glen Cove, New York